Marcgodinotius is a genus of adapiform primate that lived in Asia during the early Eocene. It is a monotypic genus, the only species being Marcgodinotius indicus. Another adapiform primate Suratius robustus was found in the same horizon. Anthrasimias may be a junior synonym of Marcgodinotius and Anthrasimias gujaratensis a junior synonym of Marcgodinotius indicus.

Marcgodinotius indicus was a species of primate first found in Gujarat, India in 2005. It is believed to have lived about 55 million years ago, during the early Eocene. It weighed around 75 grams which would make it only slightly larger than the world's smallest primates, the mouse lemurs and the dwarf galagos.

See also 
 Ganlea
 Biretia

References

External links 
New euprimate postcrania from the early Eocene of Gujarat, India, and the strepsirrhine–haplorhine divergence

Literature cited

 

Prehistoric strepsirrhines
Eocene mammals of Asia
Fossil taxa described in 2005
Prehistoric primate genera
Eocene primates
Fossils of India
Fossil taxa described in 2008